Ebenezer Remilekun Aremu Olasupo Obey-Fabiyi  (born 3 April 1942), known professionally as Ebenezer Obey, is a Nigerian jùjú musician.

Early life
Obey was born on 3 April 1942 to an Egba–Yoruba ethnic background family. Obey, whose real names are Ebenezer Remilekun Aremu Olasupo Fabiyi, was born in Idogo, Ogun State, Nigeria of Egba-Yoruba ethnic background. He is of the Owu subgroup of the Egba.

Career
Ebenezer Obey began his professional career in the mid-1950s after moving to Lagos. After tutelage under Fatai Rolling-Dollar's band, he formed a band called The International Brothers in 1964, playing highlife–jùjú fusion.  The band later metamorphosed into Inter-Reformers in the early-1970s, with a long list of Juju album hits on the West African Decca musical label.

Obey began experimenting with Yoruba percussion style and expanding on the band by adding more drum kits, guitars and talking drums.  Obey's musical strengths lie in weaving intricate Yoruba axioms into dance-floor compositions. As is characteristic of Nigerian Yoruba social-circle music, the Inter-Reformers band excel in praise-singing for rich Nigerian socialites and business tycoons.  Obey, however, is also renowned for Christian spiritual themes in his music and has since the early-1990s retired into Nigerian gospel music ministry. It will be worthy of note to also say that Chief Commander just as he is fondly called by his fans, has played alongside popular gospel music veteran, Pastor Kunle Ajayi during his 30 years on stage concert in Lagos.

Personal life
Obey married Juliana Olaide Olufade in 1963.  His wife, known as Lady Evangelist Juliana Obey-Fabiyi, died at Lagos State University Teaching Hospital on 23 August 2011, aged 67. They have several children and grand children.

Partial discography
1964 Ewa Wo Ohun Ojuri
1965 Aiye Gba Jeje b/w Ifelodun*Gari Ti Won b/w Orin Adura
1966 Awolowo Babawa Tide b/w Oluwa Niagbara Emi Mi*Palongo b/w Teti Ko Gboro Kan*Oro Miko Lenso b/w Orin Ajinde*Late Justice Olumide Omololu b/w Iyawo Ti Mo Ko Fe
1967 Olomi Gbo Temi b/w Maria Odeku*To Keep Nigeria One b/w Awa Sope Odun Titun*Edumare Lon Pese b/w Omo Olomo*Ope Fun Oluwa b/w Paulina
1968 Ore Mi E Si Pelepele b/w Ajo Ni Mo wa*Ijebu L'ade b/w Lati Owolabi*Col. Ben Adekunle b/w Ori Bayemi*Lolade Wilkey b/w Adetunji Adeyi*Gbe Bemi Oluwa b/w Olowo Laiye Mo
1969 Ode To Nso Eledumare b/w Pegan Pegan*Sanu-olu b/w K'Oluwa So Pade Wa*London Lawa Yi b/w Oro Seniwo*Isokan Nigeria / etc.*Eni Mayo Ayo / etc1969/1970*Emi Yio Gbe Oluwa Ga b/w Ise Teni
1970 Lawyer Adewuyi*Ala Taja Bala b/w Ohun Toluwa Ose*Ogun Pari / etc.*In London*On The Town
1971 Ija Pari (Part One) b/w Ija Pari (Part Two)*Esa Ma Miliki b/w Awon Alhaji*Face to Face b/w Late Rex Lawson*Oro Nipa Lace b/w Yaro Malaika
1972 Late Oba Gbadelo II*Board Members*Vol.4: Aiye Wa A Toro*In London Vol. 3*Odun Keresimesi
1973 And His Miliki Sound*The Horse, The Man and His Son*E Je Ka Gbo T'Oluwa*Adeventure of Mr. Music*Mo Tun Gbe De
1974 Inter-Reformers A Tunde*Eko Ila*Around the World*Iwalka Ko Pe
1975 Mukulu Muke Maa Jo*Ota Mi Dehin Lehin Mi*Alo Mi Alo*Edumare Dari Jiwon
1976 Late Great Murtara Murtala Ramat Muhammed*Operation Feed The Nation
1977 Eda To Mose Okunkun*Immortal Sings for Travellers*Adam and Eve
1978 Igba Owuro Lawa*Oluwa Ni Olusa Aguntan Mi*No Place Be Like My Country Nigeria
1979 In the Sixties Vol.1*In the Sixties Vol.2*Igba Laiye*Sky*E Wa Kiye Soro Mi*Omo Mi Gbo Temi
1980 Leave Everything to God*Current Affairs*Sound of the Moment*Eyi Yato
1981 Joy of Salvation*What God Has Joined Together
1982 Celebration*Austerity*Precious Gift
1983 Ambition*Singing for the People*Greatest Hits Vol. 3*Je Ka Jo*Thank You (Ose)
1984 The Only Condition to Save Nigeria*Solution*Peace1985*Security*My Vision
1986 Gbeja Mi Eledumare*Satisfaction*Providence
1987 Aimasiko*Immortality*Victory*Patience
1988 Determination*Vanity
1989 Formula 0-1-0*Get Yer Jujus Out
1990 Count Your Blessing*On the Rock
1991 Womanhood
1993 Good News
1994 I Am a Winner*Walking Over (1994 ?)
1995 The Legend
1999 Millennial Blessings
2000 Promised Land
2002 Ase Oluwa

See also
 List of Nigerian gospel musicians
List of Nigerian musicians

Notes

References

Further reading

External links
 Definitive Compilation of Ebenezer Obey's Discography by Toshiya Endo
 

Nigerian male musicians
Yoruba musicians
Musicians from Ogun State
Living people
1942 births
20th-century Nigerian musicians
Yoruba-language singers
20th-century male musicians
Provogue Records artists